The Ningdu Conference was a meeting of the Chinese Communist Party held in the Bangshan Ancestral Hall in the village of Xiaoyuan, Ningdu County, Jiangxi Province. The meeting took place in early October 1932 (possibly October 3–8), shortly after the successful repulsion of the Nationalists' third encirclement campaign against the Jiangxi Soviet by the communist forces.
 
The conference led to a shift in the tactics of the People's Liberation Army from guerrilla warfare to mobile, conventional tactics. Along with this shift in tactics, the conference resulted in Mao Zedong's removal from his leadership positions of military. He was replaced as commissar of the army by Zhou Enlai. Mao was not restored to central leadership until the Zunyi Conference during the Long March (in January 1935).

See also
 Gutian Congress (December 1929)
 Zunyi Conference (January 1935)

References  
 

Assemblies of the Chinese Communist Party
1932 in China
Military history of Jiangxi
1932 conferences